Radzików  (German: Rudelsdorf) is a village in the administrative district of Gmina Łagiewniki, within Dzierżoniów County, Lower Silesian Voivodeship, in south-western Poland. The village has a population of 350.

References

Villages in Dzierżoniów County